American synthpop band Future Islands have released six studio albums, six extended plays (EPs), 23 singles and 15 music videos. Future Islands was formed in Greenville, North Carolina but relocated to Baltimore, Maryland in 2008. It consists of John Gerrit Welmers (keyboards), William H. Cashion (bass guitar), and Samuel T. Herring (vocals). The band included Erick Murillo (drums) up until November 2007.

Main releases

Studio albums

Extended plays

Singles

Remixes

Music videos

Song usage in media

Cover songs
"Last Christmas" by Wham! (2015)

References

External links
 Official website
 allmusic Future Islands Main Albums
 allmusic Future Islands Singles & EPs
 Future Islands on Discogs

Rock music group discographies